Kevin O'Leary (born 1954) is a Canadian entrepreneur.

Kevin O'Leary may also refer to:
 Kevin O'Leary (judge) (1920–2015), Australian jurist
 Kevin O'Leary (poker player) (born 1969), UK poker professional
 Kevin O'Leary, peace officer involved in the Tatiana the Tiger incident